The Pope Benedict XVI bibliography contains a list of works by Pope Benedict XVI.

Books
The following is a list of books written by Pope Benedict XVI arranged chronologically by English first edition. The original German first edition publication year is included in brackets.

Encyclicals
The following is a list of papal encyclicals were promulgated by Pope Benedict XVI.

 Deus caritas est (God is Love) (December 25, 2005) Text
 Spe salvi (In Hope We Were Saved) (November 30, 2007) Text
 Caritas in veritate (Charity in Truth) (June 29, 2009) Text

Exhortations
The following is a list of apostolic exhortations written by Pope Benedict XVI. An apostolic exhortation is a type of communication from the Pope of the Roman Catholic Church that encourages a community of people to undertake a particular activity, but does not define Church doctrine. It is considered lower in formal authority than a papal encyclical, but higher than other ecclesiastical letters.

 Sacramentum Caritatis: On the Eucharist as the Source and Summit of the Church's Life and Mission (February 22, 2007) Text
 Verbum Domini: On the Word of God in the Life and Mission of the Church (September 30, 2010) Text
 Africae Munus: On the Church in Africa in Service to Reconciliation, Justice and Peace (November 19, 2011) Text
 Ecclesia in Medio Oriente: On the Church in the Middle East (September 14, 2012) Text

German titles
The following is a list of books written by Pope Benedict XVI arranged chronologically by German first edition. The English title is included in parentheses.

 Volk und Haus Gottes in Augustins Lehre von der Kirche (The People and House of God as Presented in Augustine's Doctrine of the Church). München: Zink, 1954.
 Die Geschichtstheologie des heiligen Bonaventura (The Historical Theology of Saint Bonaventure). München: Schnell und Steiner, 1959.
 Die christliche Brüderlichkeit (The Meaning of Christian Brotherhood). München, 1960.
 Die erste Sitzungsperiode des Zweiten Vatikanischen Konzils. Ein Rückblick (The First Session of the Second Vatican Council. A Retrospective). Köln: Bachem, 1963.
 Das Konzil auf dem Weg: Rückblick auf die 2. Sitzungsperiode des 2. Vatikanischen Konzils (The Council in Progress. Retrospective of the Second Session of the Second Vatican Council). Köln: Bachem, 1964.
 Ergebnisse und Probleme der dritten Konzilsperiode (Events and Issues of the Third Session of the Council). Köln: Bachem, 1965.
 Die letzte Sitzungsperiode des Konzils (The Council's Last Session). Köln: Bachem, 1966.
 Das Problem der Dogmengeschichte in der Sicht der katholischen Theologie (The Problem of Dogmatism from the Point of View of Catholic Theology). Köln, 1966.
 Die sakramentale Begründung christlicher Existenz. Meitingen und Freising: Kyrios-Verlag, 1967.
 Einführung in das Christentum: Vorlesungen über das Apostolische Glaubensbekenntis (Introduction to Christianity). München: Kösel Verlag, 1968.
 Meditationen zur Karwoche. Meitingen und Freising: Meitinger Kleinschriften, 1969.
 Das neue Volk Gottes: Entwürfe zur Ekklesiologie (God's New People: Concepts for Ecclesiology). Düsseldorf: Patmos-Verlag, 1969.
 Glaube und Zukunft (Faith and Future). München: Kösel Verlag, 1970.
 Die Einheit der Nationen: Eine Vision der Kirchenväter (The Unity of the Nations: A Vision of the Church Fathers). Salzburg: Pustet, 1971.
 Dogma und Verkündigung (Dogma and Preaching). München: Erich Wewel Verlag, 1973.
 Prinzipien christlicher Moral (Principles of Christian Morality). Einsiedln: Johannes Verlag, 1975.
 Eschatologie: Tod und ewiges Leben (Eschatology: Death, and Eternal Life). Regensburg: Friedrich Pustet Verlag, 1977.
 Der Gott Jesu Christi: Betrachtungen über den Dreieinigen Gott (God of Jesus Christ). München: Kösel Verlag, 1976.
 Die Tochter Zion: Betrachtungen über den Marienglaube der Kirche (Daughter Zion: Reflections on the Church's Marian Belief). Einsiedln: Johannes Verlag, 1977.
 Eucharistie - Mitte der Kirche. München: Wewel, 1978.
 Zum Begriff des Sakramentes (On the Concept of the Sacrament). München: Minerva Publikation, 1979.
 Umkehr zur Mitte: Meditationen eines Theologen (Turning back towards the Center: A Theologian's Meditations). Leipzig: Sankt-Benno-Verlag, 1981.
 Glaube, Erneuerung, Hoffnung. Theologisches Nachdenken über die heutige Situation der Kirche. Hrsg. von Kraning, Willi (Faith, Renewal, Hope. Theological Contemplations on the Present Situation of the Church). Leipzig: Sankt-Benno-Verlag, 1981.
 Das Fest des Glaubens: Versuche zur Theologie des Gottesdienstes (Feast of Faith: Approaches to a Theology of the Liturgy). Einsiedeln: Johannes Verlag, 1981.
 Theologische Prinzipienlehre: Bausteine zur Fundamentaltheologie (Principles of Catholic Theology: Building Stones for a Fundamental Theology). München: Erich Wewel Verlag, 1982.
 Die Krise der Katechese und ihre Uberwindung: Rede in Frankrich (Handing on the Faith in an Age of Disbelief). Einsiedeln: Johannes Verlag, 1983.
 Schauen auf den Durchbohrten (Behold the Pierced One). Einsiedeln: Johannes Verlag, 1984.
 Suchen, was droben ist: Meditationen das Jahr hindurch (Seek That Which Is Above: Meditations Throughout the Year). Freiburg im Breisgau: Verlag Herder, 1985.
 Politik und Erlösung: Zum Verhältnis von Glaube, Rationalität und Irrationalem in der sogenannten Theologie der Befreiung (Politics and Deliverance: On the Relations of Faith, Rationalism, and the Irrational in so-called Liberation Theology). Opladen: Westdeutscher Verlag, 1986.
 Im Anfang schuf Gott: Vier Predigten über Schöpfung und Fall (In the Beginning...: A Catholic Understanding of the Story of Creation and the Fall). München: Erich Wewel Verlag, 1986.
 Kirche, Ökumene und Politik: Neue Versuche zur Ekklesiologie (Church, Ecumenism, and Politics: New Endeavours in Ecclesiology). Einsiedeln: Johannes Verlag, 1987.
 Abbruch und Aufbruch: Die Antwort des Glaubens auf die Krise der Werte (Deconstruction and Awakening. The Answer of Faith to the Crisis of Values). München: Minerva Publikation, 1988.
 Auf Christus schauen: Einübung in Glaube, Hoffnung, Liebe (To Look on Christ: Exercises in Faith, Hope, and Love). Freiburg im Breisgau: Herder, 1989.
 Wendezet für Europa? Diagnosen und Prognosen zur Lage von Kirche und Welt (A Turning Point for Europe? The Church in the Modern World). Einsiedeln: Johannes Verlag, 1991.
 Zur Gemeinschaft gerufen: Kirche heute verstehen (Called to Communion. Understanding the Church Today). Freiburg im Breisgau: Herder, 1991.
 Wahrheit, Werte, Macht: Prüfsteine der pluralistischen Gesellschaft (Truth, Values, Power: The Cornerstones of a Pluralistic Society). Freiburg im Breisgau: Herder, 1993.
 Evangelium – Katechese – Katechismus: Steiflichter auf den Katechismis der katolischen Kirche (Gospel, Catechesis, Catechism). München: Verlag Neue Stadt, 1995.
 Ein neues Lied für den Herrn: Christusglaube und Liturgie in der Gegenwart (A New Song for the Lord). Freiburg im Breisgau: Verlag Herder, 1995.
 Salz der Erde. Christentum und katholische Kirche an der Jahrtausendwende (Salt of the Earth). München: Wilhelm Heyne Verlag, 1996.
 Vom Wiederauffinden der Mitte. Texte aus vier Jahrzehnten (Recovering the Center). Freiburg im Breisgau: Herder, 1997.
 Die Vielfalt der Religionen und der Eine Bund (Many Religions – One Covenant: Israel, the Church, and the World). Hagen: Verlag Urfeld, 1998.
 Einführung in den Geist der Liturgie (The Spirit of the Liturgy). 4. Aufl. Freiburg im Breisgau: Herder, 2000.
 Gott und die Welt. Glauben und Leben in unserer Welt. Ein Gespräch mit Peter Seewald (God and the World). Stuttgart: Deutsche Verlags-Anstalt, 2000.
 Gott ist uns nah: Eucharistie, Mitte des Lebens (God Is Near Us: The Eucharist, the Heart of Life). Augsburg : Sankt Ulrich, 2001.
 Weggemeinschaft des Glaubens: Krche als Communio (Pilgrim Fellowship of Faith: The Church as Communion). Augsburg: Sankt-Ulrich-Verlag, 2002.
 Glaube – Wahrheit – Toleranz. Das Christentum und die Weltreligionen (Truth and Tolerance). 2. Aufl. Freiburg im Breisgau: Verlag Herder, 2003.
 Unterwegs zu Jesus Christus (On the Way to Jesus Christ). Augsburg: Sankt-Ulrich-Verlag, 2003.
 Werte in Zeiten des Umbruchs (Values in a Time of Upheaval). Freiburg im Breisgau: Verlag Herder, 2005.
 Dialektik der Säkularisierung (The Dialectics of Secularization). Freiburg im Breisgau: Verlag Herder, 2005.
 Jesus von Nazareth, Erster Teil, Von der Taufe im Jordan bis zur Verklärung (Jesus of Nazareth, Part I: From the Baptism in the Jordan to the Transfiguration). Freiburg im Breisgau: Verlag Herder, 2007.

References
Notes

Citations

External links
 Ignatius Press

 
Bibliographies by writer
Bibliographies of German writers
Books by Pope Benedict XVI
Christian bibliographies